Jess Sum Cheuk-ying (traditional Chinese: 沈卓盈) (born 5 April 1984) is a Hong Kong actress previously under TVB.

Personal life

Sum became good friends with co-actresses Grace Chan, Katy Kung and Zoie Tam when filming the drama The Forgotten Valley. She is close with Yoyo Chen as well.

On Jan 1 2021, Sum announced she was pregnant with her first child. On 13 May 2021, Sum announced on social media that her son Jayden was born.

Filmography

TV dramas

Film

Naked Ambition (2003)
Dragon Loaded 2003 (2003) - Cadet
The Jade and the Pearl (2010) - Princess Ying
I Love Hong Kong (2011) - Young So Ching
The Fortune Buddies (2011)
I Love Hong Kong 2012 (2012)
The Fallen (2019)

As presenter
After School ICU

References

External links
Official TVB Blog of Jess Shum
Jess Shum on Sina Twitter

1982 births
Hong Kong television actresses
TVB actors
Living people
Hong Kong film actresses
21st-century Hong Kong actresses